Nerang was an electoral district of the Legislative Assembly in the Australian state of Queensland from 1986 to 2001.

The district was based in the southern part of the Gold Coast and named for the suburb of Nerang.

Members for Nerang

Election results

See also
 Electoral districts of Queensland
 Members of the Queensland Legislative Assembly by year
 :Category:Members of the Queensland Legislative Assembly by name

References

Former electoral districts of Queensland
1986 establishments in Australia
2001 disestablishments in Australia
Constituencies established in 1986
Constituencies disestablished in 2001